

government official and legal adviser. He served as Chairman of the Securitiesfrom 1935 to 1937.

Biography
Landis was born in Tokyo, Japan, where his parents were teachers at a missionary school. After completing his studies at Mercersburg Academy in 1916, he graduated from Princeton University and in 1924 received a LL.B from the Harvard Law School, where he was a student of Felix Frankfurter. In 1925, Landis was a law clerk to Justice Louis Brandeis of the U.S. Supreme Court. He then became a professor at the Harvard Law School, until called into government service during the New Deal.

Landis served as a member of the Federal Trade Commission (1933–1934), as a member of the Securities and Exchange Commission (1934–1937), and as chairman of the Securities and Exchange Commission (1935–1937). While dean of the Harvard Law School from 1937 to 1946, Landis served as regional director of the U.S. Office of Civilian Defense (1941–1942) and then as its national director (1942–1943). President Franklin D. Roosevelt then sent him to Egypt as American Director of Economic Operations in the Middle East (1943–1945). In 1946, Roosevelt's successor, Harry S. Truman, later appointed him chairman of the Civil Aeronautics Board, a position he served until the next year. A friend of the Kennedy family for years, he served as a legal advisor to Joseph P. Kennedy and as Special Counsel to President John F. Kennedy. In 1960 he drafted the Landis Report to President-elect Kennedy, reexamining the federal regulatory commissions and recommending such reforms as strengthening the commissions' chairmen and streamlining their procedures, which the Kennedy administration adopted.

Landis failed to pay his income taxes from 1956 to 1960. After this came to light in 1963, he pleaded guilty and was sentenced to one month in jail. Because of illness, he spent the month in hospital facilities. Less than a year after he returned home, he suffered a heart attack and drowned in his swimming pool.

Works
'The Business of the Supreme Court', by James M. Landis and Felix Frankfurter, (New York, 1928).
'The Administrative Process', by James M. Landis, (New Haven, 1938).

Further reading

See also 
 List of law clerks of the Supreme Court of the United States (Seat 4)

External links
The Rise and Fall of SEC Pioneer James Landis (audio story from NPR)

www.law.harvard.edu/news/spotlight/classroom/related/hls-deans.html

 

 

1899 births
1964 deaths
Deans of Harvard Law School
Members of the U.S. Securities and Exchange Commission
Law clerks of the Supreme Court of the United States
Princeton University alumni
Harvard Law School alumni
American School in Japan alumni
Franklin D. Roosevelt administration personnel
American expatriates in Japan